Route 120 or Highway 120 can refer to multiple highways:

Argentina
 National Route 120

Australia
  Hopkins Highway

Brazil
 BR-120

Canada
 New Brunswick Route 120
 Prince Edward Island Route 120
 Saskatchewan Highway 120

Costa Rica
 National Route 120

Finland
 National Highway 120 (Finland)

India
 National Highway 120 (India)

Japan
 Japan National Route 120

Korea, South
 Gyeongin Expressway

Mexico
 Mexican Federal Highway 120

United States
 U.S. Route 120 (former)
 Alabama State Route 120
 Arkansas Highway 120
 California State Route 120
 Colorado State Highway 120
 Connecticut Route 120
 Florida State Road 120
 County Road 120 (Alachua County, Florida)
 County Road 120 (Baker County, Florida)
 County Road 120 (Levy County, Florida)
 County Road 120 (Liberty County, Florida)
 Georgia State Route 120
 Hawaii Route 120 (former)
 Illinois Route 120
 Indiana State Road 120
 K-120 (Kansas highway)
 Kentucky Route 120
 Louisiana Highway 120
 Maine State Route 120
 Maryland Route 120 (former)
 Massachusetts Route 120
 M-120 (Michigan highway)
 Minnesota State Highway 120
 Missouri Route 120
 Nevada State Route 120
 New Hampshire Route 120
 New Jersey Route 120
 County Route 120 (Bergen County, New Jersey)
 New Mexico State Road 120
 New York State Route 120
 New York State Route 120A
 County Route 120 (Cortland County, New York)
 County Route 120 (Herkimer County, New York)
 County Route 120 (Jefferson County, New York)
 County Route 120 (Monroe County, New York)
 County Route 120 (Montgomery County, New York)
 County Route 120 (Niagara County, New York)
 County Route 120 (Rensselaer County, New York)
 County Route 120 (Seneca County, New York)
 County Route 120 (Steuben County, New York)
 County Route 120 (Wayne County, New York)
 North Carolina Highway 120
 Ohio State Route 120
 Oklahoma State Highway 120
 Oregon Route 120
 Pennsylvania Route 120
 Rhode Island Route 120
 South Carolina Highway 120
 Tennessee State Route 120
 Texas State Highway 120 (former)
 Texas State Highway Loop 120
 Farm to Market Road 120
 Utah State Route 120
 Vermont Route 120
 Virginia State Route 120
 Virginia State Route 120 (1928-1933) (former)
 Virginia State Route 120 (1933-1940) (former)
 Washington State Route 120 (former)
 Wisconsin Highway 120
 Wyoming Highway 120

Territories
 Puerto Rico Highway 120